Johan Ulrik Sebastian Gripenberg  (14 September 1795 Sääksmäki – 12 October 1869 Kirkkonummi) was a Finnish politician. He was a member of the Senate of Finland.

1795 births
1869 deaths
People from Valkeakoski
Swedish-speaking Finns
Finnish senators
Members of the Diet of Finland